Antonio Keithflen McDyess (born September 7, 1974) is an American former professional basketball player. Listed at  6'9" (2.06 m) and 245 lb (111 kg), McDyess played as a power forward.

Early life
McDyess was born in Quitman, Mississippi and attended the University of Alabama. As a prep, McDyess was one of the top 30 players nationally, and made the Magic Johnson Roundball Classic. McDyess played college basketball at the University of Alabama. As a sophomore, he led the Crimson Tide in scoring (13.6) and rebounding (10.0), and was considered the SEC's best big man. He decided to forgo his final two years of college to enter the 1995 NBA draft.

Playing career
McDyess was selected with the second overall pick in the 1995 draft by the Los Angeles Clippers, and was traded to the Denver Nuggets before the season began, along with Randy Woods, for fellow forward Rodney Rogers and a mid-first-round pick that was later used to select Brent Barry. McDyess's explosive leaping and power dunking ability allowed him to average 17.8 points and 8.8 rebounds per game over his first six seasons. In 1997, before his third year, McDyess was traded to the Phoenix Suns. He helped the Suns to a 56–26 record during his lone season in Phoenix.

He became a free agent prior to the lockout-shortened 1998–99 season, and returned to the Nuggets. The move was controversial however, because after he had verbally agreed to return to Denver, he reconsidered an offer to return to Phoenix. According to Sports Illustrated, Jason Kidd, Rex Chapman, and George McCloud flew through a blizzard to Denver in hopes of convincing him to re-sign with the Suns. McDyess was attending a Colorado Avalanche game with Nuggets President and General Manager Dan Issel, and Issel told security to not let the three Suns players into the building. Without any further consultation, he re-signed with the Nuggets. That season, on February 28, 1999, McDyess scored a career-high 46 points and grabbed 19 rebounds in a 116–112 win over the Vancouver Grizzlies.

Considered an up and comer, he was selected to be a part of the gold medal-winning U.S. Olympic men's basketball team at the 2000 Summer Olympics. In 2000–01, McDyess was named an All–Star and became just the third Nugget to average at least 20 points and 10 rebounds for a season, after Issel in 1977–78 and George McGinnis in 1978–79. Early in the 2001–02 season McDyess suffered a serious knee injury, a Patellar tendon rupture, that required season-ending surgery. McDyess struggled to play through the injury, re-aggravating it several times and going through additional surgeries over the next few seasons. He was sidelined due to injury for the remainder of the 2001–02 season as well as the entire 2002–03 NBA season.

McDyess was traded to the Knicks on June 26, 2002 in exchange for Marcus Camby, Mark Jackson and the draft rights to Nenê, the seventh overall pick in the 2002 NBA draft. McDyess began the 2002–03 season as a highly anticipated addition to the New York Knicks. But on October 8, 2002, with 1 minute 55 seconds left in an exhibition game against Phoenix, McDyess reinjured the knee while dunking a rebound.  He would undergo another surgery four days later. In the 2003–04 season, McDyess was traded to the Phoenix Suns after just 18 games with the Knicks in an eight–player deal that brought Stephon Marbury to New York. He remained healthy while in Phoenix for the remainder of the 2003–04 season. That off-season, his knee was declared healthy and the Detroit Pistons signed him for the full mid-level exception.

As a member of the Pistons, McDyess was successful in reinventing his game. In his first season with the Pistons, averaged 9.6 points and 6.3 rebounds per 23.3 minutes. He relied mostly on mid–range and turn–around jumpers, but remained an efficient scorer, with a 51.3% FG% (ranked 13th in the NBA), helping the Pistons to an Eastern Conference Championship, though they lost to the Spurs in the NBA Finals. He was a dependable sixth man for Detroit, playing in all 82 games in each of the next two seasons. In 2007–08, following the departure of Chris Webber, McDyess became the Pistons' starting power forward.

On November 3, 2008, McDyess was traded to the Denver Nuggets, along with Chauncey Billups and Cheikh Samb, for Allen Iverson. His inclusion in the trade was for salary cap purposes only, and the Nuggets bought out his contract. He waited the league-mandated 30-day period before he could rejoin Detroit, then re-signed with the Pistons on December 9. That postseason, on April 26, 2009, McDyess scored a playoff career-high 26 points, alongside grabbing 10 rebounds, in a deciding Game 4 loss against the Cleveland Cavaliers.

The San Antonio Spurs reached an agreement with McDyess on July 8, 2009, to a three-year deal worth the mid-level exception (up to $15 million). He spent the next two seasons with San Antonio as their starting Center, next to Tim Duncan. On January 27, 2010, McDyess scored a season-high 17 points in a 105–90 win over the Atlanta Hawks.

On December 19, 2011, McDyess announced his retirement from the NBA.

NBA career statistics

Regular season 

|-
| align="left" | 
| align="left" | Denver
| 76 || 75 || 30.0 || .485 || .000 || .683 || 7.5 || 1.0 || .7 || 1.5 || 13.4
|-
| align="left" | 
| align="left" | Denver
| 74 || 73 || 34.7 || .463 || .171 || .708 || 7.3 || 1.4 || .8 || 1.7 || 18.3
|-
| align="left" | 
| align="left" | Phoenix
| 81 || 81 || 30.1 || .536 || .000 || .702 || 7.6 || 1.3 || 1.2 || 1.7 || 15.1
|-
| align="left" | 
| align="left" | Denver
| 50 || 50 || 38.7 || .471 || .111 || .680 || 10.7 || 1.6 || 1.5 || 2.3 || 21.2
|-
| align="left" | 
| align="left" | Denver
| 81 || 81 || 33.3 || .507 || .000 || .626 || 8.5 || 2.0 || .9 || 1.7 || 19.1
|-
| align="left" | 
| align="left" | Denver
| 70 || 70 || 36.5 || .495 || - || .700 || 12.1 || 2.1 || .6 || 1.5 || 20.8
|-
| align="left" | 
| align="left" | Denver
| 10 || 10 || 23.6 || .573 || - || .818 || 5.5 || 1.8 || 1.0 || .8 || 11.3
|-
| align="left" | 
| align="left" | New York
| 18 || 6 || 23.4 || .458 || - || .579 || 6.6 || 1.1 || .7 || .6 || 8.4
|-
| align="left" | 
| align="left" | Phoenix
| 24 || 14 || 21.1 || .484 || - || .516 || 5.8 || .7 || 1.0 || .5 || 5.8
|-
| align="left" | 
| align="left" | Detroit
| 77 || 8 || 23.3 || .513 || .000 || .656 || 6.3 || .9 || .6 || .7 || 9.6
|-
| align="left" | 
| align="left" | Detroit
| 82 || 0 || 21.1 || .509 || .000 || .557 || 5.3 || 1.1 || .6 || .6 || 7.8
|-
| align="left" | 
| align="left" | Detroit
| 82 || 3 || 21.1 || .526 || - || .691 || 6.0 || .9 || .7 || .8 || 8.1
|-
| align="left" | 
| align="left" | Detroit
| 78 || 78 || 29.3 || .488 || .000 || .622 || 8.5 || 1.1 || .8 || .7 || 8.8
|-
| align="left" | 
| align="left" | Detroit
| 62 || 30 || 30.1 || .510 || - || .698 || 9.8 || 1.3 || .7 || .8 || 9.6
|-
| align="left" | 
| align="left" | San Antonio
| 77 || 50 || 21.0 || .479 || .000 || .632 || 5.9 || 1.1 || .6 || .4 || 5.8
|-
| align="left" | 
| align="left" | San Antonio
| 73 || 16 || 19.0 || .491 || .000 || .675 || 5.4 || 1.2 || .5 || .5 || 5.3
|- class="sortbottom"
| style="text-align:center;" colspan="2"| Career
| 1015 || 645 || 27.6 || .497 || .117 || .670 || 7.5 || 1.3 || .8 || 1.1 || 12.0
|- class="sortbottom"
| style="text-align:center;" colspan="2"| All-Star
| 1 || 0 || 15.0 || .444 || .000 || .000 || 8.0 || 2.0 || 1.0 || .0 || 8.0

Playoffs 

|-
| align="left" | 1998
| align="left" | Phoenix
| 4 || 4 || 36.8 || .1233 || - || .643 || 13.3 || 1.0 || .5 || 1.5 || 17.8
|-
| align="left" | 2005
| align="left" | Detroit
| 25 || 0 || 19.8 || .486 || - || .694 || 5.9 || .8 || .6 || .9 || 8.0
|-
| align="left" | 2006
| align="left" | Detroit
| 18 || 0 || 20.6 || .559 || .000 || .548 || 6.1 || .6 || .4 || .7 || 7.6
|-
| align="left" | 2007
| align="left" | Detroit
| 16 || 0 || 22.1 || .349 || .000 || .731 || 7.1 || 1.1 || .7 || .9 || 5.8
|-
| align="left" | 2008
| align="left" | Detroit
| 17 || 11 || 27.5 || .538 || - || .821 || 7.4 || .9 || .6 || .5 || 8.9
|-
| align="left" | 2009
| align="left" | Detroit
| 4 || 4 || 34.0 || .523 || - || 1.000 || 8.5 || .5 || .5 || .8 || 13.0
|-
| align="left" | 2010
| align="left" | San Antonio
| 10 || 10 || 24.7 || .532 || - || 1.000 || 6.8 || 1.2 || .2 || .7 || 6.8
|-
| align="left" | 2011
| align="left" | San Antonio
| 6 || 6 || 24.2 || .417 || - || .571 || 5.0 || 1.3 || .3 || .8 || 5.7
|- class="sortbottom"
| style="text-align:center;" colspan="2"| Career
| 100 || 35 || 23.6 || .487 || .000 || .689 || 6.8 || .9 || .5 || .8 || 8.1

References

External links
 

1974 births
Living people
African-American basketball players
Alabama Crimson Tide men's basketball players
American men's basketball players
Basketball players at the 2000 Summer Olympics
Basketball players from Mississippi
Denver Nuggets players
Detroit Pistons players
Los Angeles Clippers draft picks
Medalists at the 2000 Summer Olympics
National Basketball Association All-Stars
New York Knicks players
Olympic gold medalists for the United States in basketball
Parade High School All-Americans (boys' basketball)
People from Quitman, Mississippi
Phoenix Suns players
Power forwards (basketball)
San Antonio Spurs players
United States men's national basketball team players
21st-century African-American sportspeople
20th-century African-American sportspeople